Duplex is a genus of moths of the family Erebidae erected by Michael Fibiger in 2008.

Species
Duplex septemtria Fibiger, 2008
Duplex aarviki Fibiger, 2008
Duplex timorensis (Hampson, 1926)
Duplex hollowayi Fibiger, 2008
Duplex halmaherensis Fibiger, 2008
Duplex sumbawensis Fibiger, 2008
Duplex weintraubi Fibiger, 2010
Duplex horakae Fibiger, 2010
Duplex edwardsi Fibiger, 2010
Duplex pullata Fibiger, 2010
Duplex cockingi Fibiger, 2010

References

Micronoctuini
Noctuoidea genera